HMS Ceylon was a  light cruiser of the Royal Navy. She was of the Ceylon sub class, named after the island and British colony of Ceylon (now Sri Lanka). The cruiser saw service in the Atlantic and Pacific theatres during the Second World War. In the postwar era, she participated in actions in Egypt and the Korean War. In 1960 she transferred to the navy of Peru and renamed . The cruiser was scrapped in 1985.

Service history

Wartime career

Built by Stephens at Govan and launched on 30 July 1942, she was completed on 13 July 1943. After two months in the Home Fleet she was transferred to the 4th Cruiser Squadron, with the Eastern Fleet and took part in many carrier raids, bombardments and patrols against Japanese-held territory, including Operations Cockpit, Meridian and Diplomat. In November 1944 she joined the British Pacific Fleet and sailed from Trincomalee on 16 January, taking part in a raid on Pankalan Bradan en route. By May 1945, however, she was back in the Indian Ocean, shelling the Nicobar Islands, and remained in that theatre until the end of the war. In October 1945 she returned to England for refit and lay-up.

Postwar
Postwar, she served in the Portsmouth Command during 1946/50, followed by the 5th and 4th Cruiser Squadrons on the Far East and East Indies stations. She was actively engaged in the Korean War, carrying out a number of bombardments. 

Ceylon, in poor condition, was given a major refit from March 1955 to July 1956 to suit her for further service until the s could enter service. A Type 960 long range air warning radar replaced the existing Type 281B, while the Type 277 height finder radar was upgraded to 277Q standard and the UA-1 ESM system was fitted. Fire control for the ship's 4-inch guns was provided by US-supplied Mark 63 systems, with radar mounted on the gun mounts, while short range anti-aircraft defence was provided by an outfit of 18 Bofors 40mm guns in five twin Mark 5 mounts and eight single Mark 7 mounts, with the Mark 5 mounts provided with Simple Tachymetric directors (STD).

After trials with the new equipment, in late 1956, Ceylon was deployed to the Mediterranean where she provided long range gunfire support to suppress Egyptian shore battery emplacements at Port Said in support of the British Army and Royal Marine landings. A Communication Officer on the cruiser describes Ceylons bombardment as relatively brief, as the Egyptian batteries did not return fire. Later in the operation Ceylon served as an air direction picket,  having been withdrawn for political reasons and the cruiser Jamaica lacking modern air warning and aircraft direction equipment.  Between 1956 and 1959 she served in the Mediterranean Fleet, Home Fleet and East of Suez.

Peruvian service

On 18 December 1959, she returned to Portsmouth and was sold to Peru the same month. The disposal of the Ceylon, only three years after its modernisation, came as a shock to its last captain, Frank Twiss. On 9 February 1960, she was transferred to the Peruvian Navy and renamed . The fact Newfoundland and Ceylon under different names remained in Peruvian service till the 1980s meant some crucial parts for the maintenance of the Tigers were obtained from Peru in the 1970s.

She spent over twenty years with the Peruvians until she was finally deleted from the Navy List in May 1982, and towed to Taiwan in August 1985 to be scrapped.

Notes

References

External links

 WWII cruisers
 HMS Ceylon at Uboat.net
 IWM Interview with Cromwell Lloyd-Davies, who commanded HMS Ceylon from 1950 to 1951

 

Crown Colony-class cruisers of the Royal Navy
Ships built in Govan
1942 ships
World War II cruisers of the United Kingdom
Cold War cruisers of the United Kingdom
Korean War cruisers of the United Kingdom